Ferenc Szekeres (born 21 March 1947) is a retired long-distance runner from Hungary, who twice won the Amsterdam Marathon, in 1979 and 1981. He represented his native country in at two Summer Olympics: 1972 and 1980.

References
 1979 Year Ranking

1947 births
Living people
People from Abony
Hungarian male long-distance runners
Athletes (track and field) at the 1972 Summer Olympics
Athletes (track and field) at the 1980 Summer Olympics
Olympic athletes of Hungary
Place of birth missing (living people)
Hungarian male marathon runners
Sportspeople from Pest County
20th-century Hungarian people